Melica turczaninowiana, is a species of grass found in Mongolia, North Korea, Russia (Siberia), and China (Hebei, Heilongjiang, Henan, Inner Mongolia, and Shanxi).

Description
The species is perennial and caespitose with caulined leaves. The species leaf-sheaths are tubular with one of their length being closed. They also have scabrous surface which is also pilose and hairy as well. The panicle branches are capillary with its peduncle being scaberulous above. Florets are diminished.

Sterile floret is barren, ovate, and is clumped. Palea have eciliate keels and is 2-veined. Fruits are caryopsis, fusiform and have an additional pericarp.

Ecology
Flowers bloom from June to August.

References

turczaninowiana
Flora of Asia